Millaroo is a rural town and locality in the Shire of Burdekin, Queensland, Australia.

Geography 
The locality is bounded to the west by the Burdekin River.

It is a sugarcane growing area with underground water supplies to irrigate crops.

History 
The name Millaroo comes from Millaroo Creek, which in turn was recorded by surveyor Robert Abbott in 1895, but the original of that name are unknown. There was a pastoral property of that name.

Following World War II, a number of soldier settlement blocks were established in the area for the purpose of growing tobacco, but it was not successful.

In 1952, there was a plan to establish a new irrigation area along the Burdekin River based around a new town. The town to be called Millaroo was to be established as a "modern" "first class" planned town with reserves, parks, and industrial zones suitable for a population of 6,000 (a similar population to that of Ayr at that time). The buildings were to be constructed with brick and concrete to reduce the fire risk.

In 1952, the Millaroo Research Station was established by the Queensland Department of Agriculture and Stock to undertake agricultural research to benefit North Queensland.

The Burdekin Gorge Weir on the Burdekin River (between Ravenswood and Mount Wyatt) was completed in November 1953 to provide water for irrigation. This led to the land at Millaroo switching to growing sugarcane.

Millaroo State School opened on 19 July 1954.

Millaroo Post Office opened on 1 July 1955 and closed in 1972.

Education 
Millaroo State School is a government primary (Early Childhood-6) school for boys and girls at Cunningham Street. In 2018, the school had an enrolment of 9 students with 3 teachers (2 full-time equivalent) and 6 non-teaching staff (2 full-time equivalent).

There is no secondary school in Millaroo. The nearest secondary school is Home Hill State High School in Home Hill to the north-east, but, given the distance, families may prefer to use distance education or boarding schools.

References

External links 

 

Towns in Queensland
Shire of Burdekin
Localities in Queensland